The Aspark Owl is an all-electric battery-powered sports car manufactured by Japanese engineering firm Aspark (アスパーク), under development since 2018, with the goal of making the fastest accelerating electric car. It will be built by Manifattura Automobili Torino (MAT) in Italy. Aspark plans a production run of 50 vehicles, with a list price of €2.5 million. The OWL was publicly unveiled in concept form at the 2017 Frankfurt Auto Show, and the production version was unveiled in November 2019 at the Dubai International Motor Show.

Specifications and performance

The OWL has carbon fibre body work built around a carbon fibre monocoque chassis weighing . A stainless steel support structure is incorporated in the roof to increase the bodywork's strength. Changes to the bodywork from the concept include the addition of wing mirrors, an active rear wing and a redesigned rear glass. The car features double wishbone suspension with hydraulic dampers and torque vectoring for improved handling. Stopping power is handled by a carbon-ceramic braking system with 10-piston front calipers and 4-piston rear calipers.

Gallery

See also
 NIO EP9
Tesla Roadster (2020)
Rimac Concept One
Rimac Nevera
List of production cars by power output

References

Further reading
 株式会社アスパークR&D事業部 (Aspark R&D),  (September 2017)
  GigaZine,  (11 February 2018)

External links

 Aspark EVs webpage: Home || 変わる「価値観」、変わらない「走る喜び」 ASPARK 電気自動車開発 プロジェクト

Electric concept cars
Electric sports cars
All-wheel-drive vehicles
Cars of Japan
Cars introduced in 2017
Production electric cars